Cornechiniscus is a genus of tardigrades in the family Echiniscidae. It was named and described by Walter Maucci and Giuseppe Ramazzotti in 1981.

Species
The genus includes nine species:
 Cornechiniscus brachycornutus Maucci, 1987
 Cornechiniscus ceratophorus (Maucci, 1973)
 Cornechiniscus cornutus (Richters, 1907)
 Cornechiniscus holmeni (Petersen, 1951)
 Cornechiniscus lobatus (Ramazzotti, 1943)
 Cornechiniscus madagascariensis Maucci, 1993 
 Cornechiniscus schrammi (Dastych, 1979) 
 Cornechiniscus subcornutus Maucci & Ramazzotti, 1981
 Cornechiniscus tibetanus (Maucci, 1979)

References

Further reading
 Maucci & Ramazzotti, 1981 : Cornechiniscus gen. nov.: nuova posizione sistematica per i cosiddetti 'Pseudechiniscus gruppo cornutus', con descrizione di una nuova specie (Tardigrada, Echiniscidae). Memorie dell'Istituto Italiano di Idrobiologia Dott Marco de Marchi, vol. 39, p. 147-151.
 Nomenclator Zoologicus info

Echiniscidae
Tardigrade genera